De Vico is a small lunar impact crater that is located in the southwest part of the Moon, to the south of the crater Sirsalis. To the west-northwest is Crüger. De Vico is a circular, bowl-shaped formation with a small, flat bottom at the midpoint. To the northwest is the lava-flooded remains of De Vico T. Beyond is a linear rille designated Rimae Sirsalis that follows a path to the northeast past the rim of Sirsalis.

Satellite craters
By convention these features are identified on Lunar maps by placing the letter on the side of the crater midpoint that is closest to De Vico.

References

 
 
 
 
 
 
 
 
 
 
 
 

Impact craters on the Moon